Claudia Bühlmann is a Swiss bobsledder who competed in the mid-1990s. She was the first ever Bobsleigh World Cup champion in the two-woman event in 1994-95.

References
List of two-woman bobsleigh World Cup champions since 1995

Living people
Swiss female bobsledders
Year of birth missing (living people)
20th-century Swiss women